The enzyme 5-dehydro-2-deoxyphosphogluconate aldolase catalyzes the chemical reaction

5-dehydro-2-deoxy-D-gluconate 6-phosphate  glycerone phosphate + malonate semialdehyde

This enzyme belongs to the family of lyases, specifically the aldehyde-lyases, which cleave carbon-carbon bonds.  The systematic name of this enzyme class is 5-dehydro-2-deoxy-D-gluconate-6-phosphate malonate-semialdehyde-lyase (glycerone-phosphate-forming). Other names in common use include phospho-5-keto-2-deoxygluconate aldolase, 5-dehydro-2-deoxy-D-gluconate-6-phosphate, and malonate-semialdehyde-lyase.

References

 

EC 4.1.2
Enzymes of unknown structure